Aisha is a Maldivian romantic drama television series developed for Television Maldives by Abdul Faththaah. The series stars Jamsheedha Ahmed, Ibrahim Hilmy, Arifa Ibrahim, Niuma Mohamed and Aminath Rasheedha in pivotal roles.

Premise
Aisha is forced to drop out from school and start working at a family-friend's guest house to earn an income needed to recover from their financial debt. She continues a strenuous life with work while dealing with her abusive mother, Ameena (Arifa Ibrahim). While she is working at Azima's (Aminath Rasheedha) guest-house, Aisha meets Shamaal (Ibrahim Hilmy) an adoptive child of Azima whom she likes instantly. Azima approves their relationship though the couple decide not to share the news with Ameena considering the family crisis she deals with. However, Ameena discovers their affair and storms off to Azima while forbidding Aisha from working at the guesthouse. After several negotiations Ameena bless the couple and they marry. Few months past their marriage, Aisha and Shamaal is blessed with a child though he becomes quite abusive to Aisha while calling her a "misfortune" to him.

Cast

Main
 Jamsheedha Ahmed as Aisha
 Ibrahim Hilmy as Shamaal
 Arifa Ibrahim as Ameena
 Niuma Mohamed as Shaama
 Aminath Rasheedha as Azima
 Asad Shareef as Aanim
 Waleedha Waleed as Nahidha
 Ali Shameel as Naseem

Recurring
 Ahmed as Ziyad
 Sheleen as Sama
 Mariyam Nisha as Neena; Naseem’s first wife
 Mariyam Haleem as Faathuma; Shaama's mother
 Khadheeja Mohamed as Mary
Ahmed Saeed as Jina's brother
Koyya Hassan Manik as Naseem's Father

Guest
 Ahmed Shimau as Aanim's friend
 Chilhiya Moosa Manik as a doctor

Soundtrack

Response
The series mainly received positive reviews from critics and viewers. Ahmed Adhushan from Mihaaru choose the series among the "Top 5 best series directed by Faththaah". Sajid Abdulla reviewing from MuniAvas selected the series in the "Top 10 best television series of all time" and praised the performance of leading actors along with the title song for holding a "repeating value".

References

Serial drama television series
Maldivian television shows